Recherche Fjord is a small fjord on the south side of Bellsund, Spitsbergen. The glacier Recherchebreen debouches into the fjord from south, and Renardbreen from west.

History

The fjord is named after the French cruiser La Recherche, which visited Spitsbergen in 1838 and 1839. The Dutch had named it in the early 17th century Schoonhaven (English: Beautiful Bay). The English commonly called it Ice Bay. The whaling industries of the Netherlands and of the United Kingdom established shore stations within the fjord in the first half of the seventeenth century, most notably Lægerneset on the eastern side of the fjord.

References

Conway, W. M. 1906. No Man's Land: A History of Spitsbergen from Its Discovery in 1596 to the Beginning of the Scientific Exploration of the Country. Cambridge: At the University Press.
 Norwegian Polar Institute Place Names of Svalbard Database

Whaling stations in Norway
Fjords of Spitsbergen